D34 was a diesel locomotive built by English Electric, Rocklea for Australian Iron & Steel's, Port Kembla steelworks in 1969.

History
In 1969, Australian Iron & Steel purchased D34 which was similar to the R class that English Electric were building for the Western Australian Government Railways. It was the largest locomotive operated by Australian Iron & Steel to haul coal trains from Kimera, Nebo and Wongawilli collieries to Port Kembla.

In April 2011, D34 was sold to the Lithgow State Mine Heritage Park & Railway.

References

BHP Billiton diesel locomotives
Co-Co locomotives
English Electric locomotives
Diesel locomotives of New South Wales
Pacific National diesel locomotives
Railway locomotives introduced in 1969
Standard gauge locomotives of Australia
Diesel-electric locomotives of Australia